This is a list of state highway business routes in the U.S. state of Arkansas. The business routes are named after their parent highways, which leads to multiple designations of the same name in some cases. All business routes are maintained by the Arkansas Department of Transportation (ArDOT).

Shields

Arkansas state highway business routes are signed using standard state highway shield backgrounds. The number remains the same size and a "B" (for business) is added in an almost-exponential format. Shield sizes remain, one-digit routes keep the  shields, while two-digit routes become . Three-digit routes are the same as the parent route with the "B" placed in the available corner space. The "Business" banners are usually not used by ArDOT, which instead prefers to use only a direction banner.

Some business routes are known as "city routes", and have a "C" instead of a "B" with the same effect, thus are included herein.

State highway business routes

See also

References

 
 
 
 
 
 

State Business